West Java Syndicate is an Indonesian ethnic-fusion music group founded in 2010 in Bandung, Indonesia. The group seeks to promote a wide variety of world music based on  Sundanese music using traditional Sundanese musical instruments, as well as exploring contemporary styles.

History
West Java Syndicate came alive in 2010 by Zahar Mustilaq,
the drummer who actually live in between two spheres, the
Sundanese traditional and the modern western music like
jazz, blues, rock and so on.
He then asked rock bass player Dede SP to form a group with a touch of Indonesian sundanese traditional music. Dede then invited his old college friend, keyboardist/pianist YD Nafis. SambaSunda's Zinner then join the team as well.

Their very first public performance was in a monthly jazz event in Bandung called Sunday Jazz at Potluck 
. Zinner left the group in the middle of 2011, and then Dosenk came up as replacement.

In early 2013 they went to studio for a recording session. The line-up for the recording was Zahar Mustilaq, Dede SP and YD Nafis on modern instrument section, and traditional section was Dosenk on Suling and Kendang, Asep Hadiat on Kendang, and Ludy Heryanto on Rebab and Tarompet. The recording result is an EP titled “Albeum Leutik” (Sundanese for Mini Album), released worldwide in November 2013

Members

Discography

Album 
 Bubuka - 2017

EP 
 Albeum Leutik - 2013

Singles 
 Tembang Katresna - 2013
 Gending Rame ku Kendang - 2013

References

External links
Official website
Facebook Fan Page

Indonesian musical groups
World music groups
Musical groups established in 2010
Sundanese music
2010 establishments in Indonesia